The Innocent Lie is a 1916 American silent film produced by Famous Players Film Company and distributed by Paramount. It was directed by Sidney Olcott with Valentine Grant as leading woman.

Plot

Cast 
 Valentine Grant as Nora O'Brien
 Jack J. Clark as Terry O'Brien
 Morris Foster as Pat O'Brien
 Hunter Areden as Nora Owen
 Robert Cain as Captain Stewart
 Frank Losee 
 William Courtleigh Jr
 Helen Lindroth
 Charles Fergusson

Production notes 
The film was shot in Bermuda.

References 

 Michel Derrien, Aux origines du cinéma irlandais: Sidney Olcott, le premier oeil, TIR 2013.

External links 

 
 
The Innocent Lie at Irish Film & TV Research Online
  The Innocent Lie at website dedicated to Sidney Olcott

1916 films
1916 drama films
Silent American drama films
American silent feature films
Films set in Ireland
Films directed by Sidney Olcott
American black-and-white films
1910s American films